Dilophus is a genus of March flies in the family Bibionidae. There are at least 200 described species in Dilophus.

Species found in Europe 
Dilophus antipedalis
Dilophus beckeri
Dilophus bispinosus
Dilophus borealis
Dilophus febrilis
Dilophus femoratus
Dilophus hiemalis
Dilophus humeralis
Dilophus lingens
Dilophus maderae
Dilophus minor
Dilophus neglectus
Dilophus oceanus
Dilophus sardous
Dilophus tenuis
Dilophus tridentatus

See also
 List of Dilophus species

References

Further reading

External links

 

Bibionidae
Bibionomorpha genera